Give Yourself Goosebumps is a children's horror fiction gamebook series by R. L. Stine. After the success of the regular Goosebumps books, Scholastic Press decided to create this spin-off series in 1995. In fact, Stine had written gamebooks in previous years.

Fifty books in the series, including the "special editions" were published between 1995 and 2000. All of the books in the series, with the exception of Please Don't Feed the Vampire, are now out-of-print.

General plotline
For the most part, play is rather simple, as the books are merely novels with branching plots. The books are written in the second person and enlivened by puzzles or choices. Rather than being simply from beginning to end, the reader is told to turn to a certain page at the bottom of the current page, at certain pages the reader will be given at least two choices of which page to turn to, depending on what they want the main character (one's self) to do. If the reader makes poor choices, the book may come to a "bad" ending that will feature a horrid fate for the main character, but the reader is always able to go back and choose a new choice.  

There is also at least one page in each book that uses an alternative method to selecting each choice, and is done more by chance rather than the reader's decision. These include; "Tossing a Coin" (where "Heads" represents one page and "Tails" another) "Rolling a Die" ("Odd" and "Even" sides having their own pages), or the reader trying a challenge in real life (and turning to a different page depending on whether they were successful or not). This whole structure came from the then-popular Choose Your Own Adventure book series. 

There are normally two "main stories" and one "side story" which have their own set of choices, and a certain decision - usually at the first two choices that will determine which of the two "stories" the reader will be a part of, the side story will usually feature inside one of the two main stories, would consist of a small group of choices, and is usually more lighthearted than the rest of the book. Also, there is sometimes a group of choices, which contain one choice which is blatantly wrong (such as eating the blue eggs in Escape from Camp Run-For-Your-Life or failing to acknowledge the situation in Welcome to the Wicked Wax Museum as an emergency).  If (s)he makes one of these choices the book will break the fourth wall and demand that the reader turns back and choose a better option, or sometimes simply end the whole book then and there. This literary trope is characteristic of many late 20th century Western works of metafiction.

It is also worth noting that the main character is never named and is usually of ambiguous gender; therefore the reader can easily imagine himself or herself as the main character regardless of what sex he or she is, however, sometimes the occasional "he" slips through. There is, however, a "friend character" who is named and given a gender, these characters are normally present throughout the storyline. The only thing linking the main character in each story is that they are self-proclaimed "Goosebumps Experts".

Endings

Because of the choices and page connections, there are many ways the story can end. These vary depending on which book is being read, but largely the endings involve the reader's character dying, permanently metamorphosing into something other than human, getting trapped somewhere inescapable (implying that one will die eventually), being put in a state of immobility such as becoming a statue, or - if the correct choices are met - surviving the story. The ending pages are the only ones which have no choices, and simply have the words "The End" where the choices would usually be. Occasionally it will just say "End" because it is supposed to be part of the final sentence, or it will say something else appropriate.

There are also endings that combine the above options, such as being mutated, and then being killed because of whatever it is they are now or an almost "good" ending in which - despite the reader's metamorphosis - the ending is still relatively satisfying, in The Deadly Experiments of Dr. Eeek, the reader can metamorphose into a dog if the wrong choice is chosen, but still gets home in one ending, albeit stuck in dog form. Not all bad choices will take the reader to a bad ending immediately; instead, they will sometimes take the reader to another page which has its own choices, but all of them will lead to a bad ending - this is because a previous choice has put the reader in an inescapable situation, where there is no chance of making it out alive, and although they do not die immediately from that choice, the reader has ultimately gotten "killed" by making that decision.  Fortunately, the reverse occasionally happens as well; some choices will take the reader to a page with choices that all lead to a good ending.

In addition, each book involves at least one page where the reader's knowledge of the actual Goosebumps books is called into question. This can either involve them being asked a question relating to one of the actual Goosebumps books, or simply being faced with something that has previously appeared in Goosebumps, and only a true Goosebumps fan would know how to respond to it. For the questions, the reader is given the choice of turning to one of two pages - one where they give the correct answer and one where they give the wrong answer (which usually has some subtle similarities to the correct one), and for the references, the reader is just given choices, which are blatant if they know what book the choices are referring to, but make no sense if they do not. Answering correctly will allow the story to continue, but answering incorrectly will normally result in death. There is at least one good ending in each book, as opposed to the 20+ scary endings (explained above).

US and UK versions of covers
The covers were metallic and holographic, showing a basic design repeated on the cover background. One color colored the entire design, and the design would change slightly when the book was moved to different areas of light. The design itself changed with every book, although some of the designs are repeated, as in books 10, 12, 13, 16, 17, and 19. Three illustrators did the cover illustrations, the first was Tim Jacobus, who did the original series and Goosebumps Series 2000. Jacobus only did one cover, Escape from the Carnival of Horrors, and it is often mistaken for Mark Nagata, who illustrated the next 22 books, because Jacobus' signature is not visible on the front. It is, however, visible on the back, as it was obscured by Choose from over 20 Different Scary Endings! on the front.
Mark Nagata illustrated the next book, Tick Tock, You're Dead!, throughout number 24, Lost in Stinkeye Swamp. Number 25, Shop Till You Drop... Dead!, was illustrated by Craig White, whose illustrations were made with computers and who illustrated the last 17 through number 42, All Day Nightmare and all 8 of the special edition books.

 In the UK, books 1-14 contained covers with the pictures almost completely obscured by an illustration of a slimy substance
 This occasionally obscured important parts of the cover (e.g. in Diary of a Mad Mummy, it is impossible to actually see the diary on the UK cover.) The later books of the UK had more detail to them and were no longer covered, but still had slightly less detail than the US version.
 The UK version did not sparkle like the US version.
 The US version had a tagline on the back of the books, the UK version did not
 The synopses between the UK/US were different.

List of Give Yourself Goosebumps books
{| class="wikitable" style="width:100%;"
|-
!  style="width:30px; background:#58c035; color:#fff;"|# !!  style="background:#58c035;color:#fff;"|Title !!  style="width:160px; background:#58c035; color:#fff;"|Original published date !! style="background:#58c035;color:#fff;"|Pages !!  style="width:120px; background:#58c035;"|ISBN

|-
! style="background:#58c035;color:#fff;" colspan="5"| Special Edition
|-

|}

References

External links
 Give Yourself Goosebumps at Gamebooks.org
 Give Yourself Goosebumps at Scary For Kids

Book series introduced in 1995
Gamebooks
Goosebumps
Metafictional works